United Bicycle Institute (UBI) is a private career school for bicycle mechanics and custom bicycle frame building in Ashland, Oregon, United States.
The school offers one and two week courses in addition to continuing education seminars, and has hosted students from over 45 different countries. Licensed by the Oregon Higher Education Coordinating Commission, UBI educates veterans and those with VA education benefits, as well as traditional students ranging from home mechanics to experienced mechanics looking to certify or continue their education in more specialized avenues like wheel-building, suspension work, and frame building. 

Ron Sutphin, the current owner, has been an instructor since it was founded in 1981 by Wayne Martin. 

In the summer of 2009, the institute opened a second campus in Portland offering the same curriculum as its campus in Ashland. In 2019, the Portland campus closed, and the school once again became housed under one roof in Southern Oregon. The campus features a mechanics classroom with custom-designed workbenches and professional grade tools, as well as a frame shop with access to drafting tables, frame jigs, torches and welders.

After graduation, the school offers graduates certificates of completion and access to a graduates-only area of their website.

Classes Offered

Bicycle Mechanics Classes 
 Introduction to Bicycle Maintenance, 5 days
 Professional Repair & Shop Operation, 10 days

Frame Building Classes 
 Cromoly Brazing Frame Building
 Cromoly TIG Welding Frame Building
 Titanium Frame Building
 TIG Welding Seminar

Advanced and Continuing Education Seminars 
 Certified Suspension Technician
 UBI/DT Swiss Certified Wheel Builder
 FOX Master Tech Clinic
 UBI Disc Brake Seminar
 Shimano Di2 Course
 Bosch Technician Training
 Dropper Post Seminar

Prominent Alumni
 David Bohm, Bohemian Bicycles

References

External links
 Official website

Cycling in Oregon
Ashland, Oregon
Companies based in Ashland, Oregon
Privately held companies based in Oregon
Education in Jackson County, Oregon
1981 establishments in Oregon